Johannes Stefanus Joseph "Hans" Hillen (born 17 June 1947) is a retired Dutch politician of the Christian Democratic Appeal (CDA) party and journalist.

Biography

Early life
Hillen studied sociology at Utrecht University. He has been a (sports) journalist for the Nederlandse Omroep Stichting (NOS), teacher and civil servant (in the eighties he was spokesman of minister of Finance Onno Ruding and defender of his outspoken budget cuts) before entering in politics

Politics
From 1990 till 2002 he was a member of the House of Representatives and from 2007 till 2010 a member of the Senate. From October 14, 2010, to November 5, 2012, he was minister of Defence. He is in favor of a strong defence and close ties with NATO.

Other activities
From 2003 till 2007 Hillen was president of CVZ, the Dutch council for the healthcare, and from 2005 till 2010 a member of the executive board of the Dutch employers' organization VNO-NCW. He also did some writing, he wrote columns for Elsevier and Katholiek Nieuwsblad.

Furthermore, he is involved in the Edmund Burke Foundation, a Dutch conservative think tank. In 2004 he left the advisory council because a conflict of opinion with prominent co-member Bart Jan Spruyt, who wanted to found a new political party with Geert Wilders.

Personal life
Hillen is married and resides in Hilversum. He is a member of the Roman Catholic Church.

Decorations

References

External links

Official
  Drs. J.S.J. (Hans) Hillen Parlement & Politiek
  Drs. J.S.J. Hillen (CDA) Eerste Kamer der Staten-Generaal

1947 births
Living people
Catholic People's Party politicians
Christian Democratic Appeal politicians
Dutch columnists
Dutch corporate directors
Dutch magazine editors
Dutch nonprofit directors
Dutch nonprofit executives
Dutch lobbyists
Dutch sports journalists
Dutch reporters and correspondents
Dutch trade association executives
Dutch Roman Catholics
Dutch television editors
Dutch television presenters
Dutch speechwriters
Members of the House of Representatives (Netherlands)
Members of the Senate (Netherlands)
Ministers of Defence of the Netherlands
Officers of the Order of Orange-Nassau
People from Hilversum
Politicians from The Hague
Utrecht University alumni
20th-century Dutch civil servants
20th-century Dutch educators
20th-century Dutch journalists
20th-century Dutch male writers
20th-century Dutch politicians
21st-century Dutch civil servants
21st-century Dutch educators
21st-century Dutch journalists
21st-century Dutch male writers
21st-century Dutch politicians